John Frow (born 13 November 1948 in Coonabarabran, Australia) is an Australian academic who works in the areas of literary theory, narrative theory, intellectual property law, and cultural studies. He is currently a professor of English at the University of Sydney.

Career 
Frow’s area of research is humanities and social sciences. It ranges from technical work in literary theory and discourse analysis through to empirical and statistically-based sociology.

His doctoral work and first book, "Marxism and Literary History" (1986), reworks Marxist theory for a non-determinist account of literary systems. His work draws on Althusser and Foucault, as well as on Russian Formalist theory, German reception aesthetics, a critical engagement with post-structuralist theory, and on a broad range of literary texts. It theorized the relation between discourse and power, the relational structure of literary texts and systems, and the dynamics of literary change.

Frow’s later work draws on the framework elaborated in this book, although he has subsequently moved away from a commitment to Marxism towards a more Foucauldian understanding of social and discursive power. "Cultural Studies and Cultural Value" (1995) undertook a critique of the hierarchy of value that sorts ‘high’ and ‘low’ culture into distinct domains, arguing that the field of culture now has multiple centres and multiple domains of value which are irreducible to a single scale.

The book formulated an account of the ‘knowledge class’ of information workers and argued that it has specific interests in the field of culture. The central essay of "Time and Commodity Culture" (1997) theorized the distinction and the inter-dependence of gift and commodity economies as a way of analyzing the encroachment of the commodity form on the commons in information; other essays in the book explored the temporality of capital as the basis for historical understanding and the technologies of memory.

"Accounting for Tastes: Australian Everyday Cultures" (1999), written with Tony Bennett and Michael Emmison, is a study, based on a broad survey and the resulting quantitative analysis, of the cultural practices and preferences of Australians across a range of cultural areas. It sought to develop an account of social class in which cultural capital plays a central and formative role, and developed the concept of the regime of value to theorize the structural regularities it found.

Books 
Frow’s most recent books have focused on questions of literary theory and its relation to cultural studies. "Genre" (2006; second revised edition 2015) explores the work of generic classification across a range of literary and cultural texts, understanding genres not as fixed frameworks but as dynamic processes of organization of social knowledge.

"The Practice of Value" (2013) is a collection of essays on the relationship between literary and cultural studies. And "Character and Person" (2014) explores the nature of human personhood by setting models of the person in relation to models of fictional character in a number of distinct literary and cinematic systems. The book argues both for the specificity of the person and fictional character, and for the ways in which each of them depends upon and informs our understanding of the other. Its concepts are "formal enough to bring us back to history," and develop "an unprecedentedly systematic model for understanding both literary character and social person, which are always defined in relation to one another."

Education
Frow was educated at Wagga High School and the Australian National University. After working and travelling for two years in Buenos Aires and elsewhere in South America he undertook graduate studies in the Comparative Literature Department at Cornell University (including a year as an exchange student at the University of Heidelberg). He received his PhD in 1977.

Academic positions
After holding teaching positions at Knox College, Sydney, in 1969, the Universidad del Salvador in Buenos Aires in 1970, and Cornell University in 1974-5, Frow’s first full-time academic position was at the newly created Murdoch University in Western Australia, where he worked from 1975 to 1988.

He taught in the Comparative Literature Department at the University of Minnesota in 1988, and in 1989 took up a chair in the English Department at the University of Queensland. He moved to the University of Edinburgh as the Regius Professor of Rhetoric and English Literature in 2000, where he was also the director of the Institute for Advanced Studies in the Humanities; in 2004 he returned to Australia, taking up the chair of English Language and Literature at the University of Melbourne. He moved to his current position at the University of Sydney in 2013.

Frow has held visiting fellowships at Wesleyan University, the University of Chicago, New York University, and Goldsmiths College, University of London. He is a Fellow of the Australian Academy of the Humanities.

Editorial positions
Frow was a founding member of the "Australian Journal of Cultural Studies" (1983-1987) and of "Cultural Studies" (1987-). He was co-editor of the "Cultural Studies Review" from 2006 to 2012. He is a member of the Editorial Boards or Advisory Boards of "Textual Practice", "The Journal of Literary Criticism", "Australian Humanities Review", "Continuum", "ACH: The Journal of the History of Culture in Australia", the "Journal of Cultural Economy", "Law, Culture and the Humanities", the "Indian Journal of Law and Technology", "New Literary History", "Third Text", the "Genre Across Borders Web Resource", "Axon: Creative Explorations", "Humanities", "International Journal of Comparative Literature and Translation Studies", "Journal of Poetics Research", and "Persona Studies".

He has been a consulting editor for "Social Semiotics", a member of the board of "m/c: A Journal of Media and Culture", and was the Australian Reviews Editor for "Cultural Studies" from 1987-1996. He is the Senior Editor for Literary Theory on the "Oxford Research Encyclopedia of Literature".

Publications
Frow is the author of seven major monographs and two co-edited collections, in addition to a number of smaller monographs and over a hundred book chapters and refereed journal articles. His work has been widely reprinted and has been translated into Chinese, Persian, Japanese, French, Polish, Macedonian, Spanish, and Portuguese.

Monographs
 "Marxism and Literary History" was published by Harvard University Press and Basil Blackwell in 1986, with a second edition in 1988. 
 "Cultural Studies and Cultural Value"  was published by the Clarendon Press in 1995.
 "Time and Commodity Culture" was published, again by the Clarendon Press, in 1997.
 "Accounting for Tastes: Australian Everyday Cultures" (co-authored with Tony Bennett and Michael Emmison) was published by Cambridge University Press in 1999. 
 "Genre" was published by Routledge in its New Critical Idiom series in 2006, with a second revised edition in 2015.
 "The Practice of Value" was published by the University of Western Australia Press in 2013.
 "Character and Person" was published by Oxford University Press in 2014.

Edited collections
 "Australian Cultural Studies: A Reader", edited with Meaghan Morris, was published by Allen and Unwin and the University of Illinois Press in 1993.  
 "The SAGE Handbook of Cultural Analysis", edited with Tony Bennett, was published by Sage in 2008.

References

External links
John Frow's profile at The University of Sydney
John Frow at ResearchGate
A selection of John Frow's work

1948 births
Living people
Academic staff of the University of Sydney
Australian literary critics
Australian non-fiction writers
Fellows of the Australian Academy of the Humanities
Academics of the University of Edinburgh